Leo Frederick Douglass (February 13, 1901 – April 3, 1985) was a professional football who played in the National Football League in 1926. Douglass split the 1926 season playing for the Brooklyn Lions and the Frankford Yellow Jackets. He won the 1926 NFL championship when with Yellow Jackets.

Prior to joining the NFL, Douglass played for the Millville Big Blue based in Millville, New Jersey. He scored 8 touchdowns for the Big Blue that season. In January 1926, several members of the team traveled to Florida to play several pick-up games against the Tampa Cardinals, featuring Jim Thorpe. The team that was formed was called the Haven-Villa of Winter Haven, which consisted of many Big Blue players as well as some other from the Frankford Yellow Jackets and the NFL's Pottsville Maroons. Douglass also played for the Bethlehem Bears of the Eastern League of Professional Football in 1926.

Prior to playing professional football, Douglass played college football at Lehigh University and the University of Vermont

References

No Alibis (October 22, 1920 New York Times)
Millville Big Blue 1925
Bethlehem Bears Eastern League of Professional Football Claimants, 1926

1901 births
1985 deaths
Sportspeople from Middlesex County, Massachusetts
Players of American football from Massachusetts
American football fullbacks
Brooklyn Lions players
Frankford Yellow Jackets players
Lehigh Mountain Hawks football players
Vermont Catamounts football players
University of Vermont alumni
Millville Football & Athletic Club players
People from Wakefield, Massachusetts